Marcel David Lewis (born 30 September 2001) is an English professional footballer who plays as a midfielder for  EFL Championship club Burnley.

Club career
Prior to joining Cambridge United at under-9 level, Lewis played for local side Cambourne Rovers. In September 2016, Lewis joined Premier League side, Chelsea, earning his scholarship in 2018. Featuring regularly for the under-18 side, Lewis was promoted to the under-23s ahead of the 2020–21 campaign and went onto contribute five goals in 17 appearances, additionally scoring in their EFL Trophy group-stage tie with Bristol Rovers before leaving the club in July at the end of his contract.

On 11 May 2021, it was announced that Lewis would leave Chelsea in favour for a move to Belgian side, Union SG on a three-year deal, with the option of a fourth year. On 21 September 2021, Lewis made his Union SG debut during their Belgian Cup fifth round tie with FC Lebbeke, playing the full 90 minutes in the 7–0 win.

On 31 January 2022, Lewis joined EFL League One side Accrington Stanley on loan for the remainder of the 2021–22 season.

On 1 September 2022, Lewis joined EFL Championship club Burnley on a two-year contract.

International career
Lewis received a maiden call-up to the England U20 side for their training camps in November 2020.

Career statistics

References

External links

2001 births
Living people
People from Cambridge
English footballers
Black British sportspeople
Association football midfielders
Cambridge United F.C. players
Chelsea F.C. players
Royale Union Saint-Gilloise players
Accrington Stanley F.C. players
Burnley F.C. players
Belgian Pro League players
English Football League players
English expatriate sportspeople in Belgium
English expatriate footballers
Expatriate footballers in Belgium